Pellasimnia mcoyi is a species of sea snail, a marine gastropod mollusk in the family Ovulidae, the ovulids, cowry allies or false cowries.

References

 Lorenz F. & Fehse D. (2009) The living Ovulidae. A manual of the families of allied cowries: Ovulidae, Pediculariidae and Eocypraeidae. Hackenheim: Conchbooks.

External links
 Tenison Woods, J. E. (1878). On some new marine Mollusca. Transactions and Proceedings of the Royal Society of Victoria. 14: 55-65

Ovulidae
Gastropods described in 1878